Mayer Schorr (11 October 1856—24 December 1913) was a cantor in Vienna.  He was the father of operatic baritone Friedrich Schorr.

He was born in Fălticeni, Romania.

For years he held the title of Oberkantor.  He was cantor of the Stadttempel in Vienna.

In 1902  he published a selection of cantorial music, Halel Wesimroh: Lobgesänge der Synagoge für Cantor und gemischten Chor.

He died in Vienna.

Mayer Schorr left five recordings with his choir for Columbia (Vienna 1904).

Recordings
Schorr is known to have made three recordings for the Columbia Phonograph Company:
Aresches Sefosenu, Columbia E 374; also issued as 41124
Weschomeru: Kiddusch lerosch haschonoh, Columbia E 375; also issued as 41129
Haschkiwenu, Columbia E 376; also issued as 41126
Ki attoh schaumea kol schafor (Schorr), Columbia 41125
Hinneni heuni (Schorr), Columbia 41128

References

Works consulted

1856 births
1913 deaths
People from Fălticeni
Romanian Jews
Moldavian Jews
Hazzans
Jewish classical musicians
19th-century male musicians